This is a list of candidates for the 1988 New South Wales state election. The election was held on 19 March 1988.

Retiring Members

Labor
 Peter Cox MLA (Auburn)
 Pat Hills MLA (Elizabeth)
 Ron Mulock MLA (St Marys)
 Ernie Quinn MLA (Wentworthville)
 Arthur Wade MLA (Newcastle)
 Marie Fisher MLC
 Clive Healey MLC
 Norm King MLC
 Joe Thompson MLC

Liberal
 Jim Clough MLA (Eastwood)
 Greg Percival MLC
 Peter Philips MLC

National
 Col Fisher MLA (Upper Hunter)

Independent
 Bruce Duncan MLA (Lismore)
 Toby MacDiarmid MLC – elected as National

Legislative Assembly
Sitting members are shown in bold text. Successful candidates are highlighted in the relevant colour. Where there is possible confusion, an asterisk (*) is also used.

Legislative Council
Sitting members are shown in bold text. Tickets that elected at least one MLC are highlighted in the relevant colour. Successful candidates are identified by an asterisk (*).

See also
 Members of the New South Wales Legislative Assembly, 1988–1991
 Members of the New South Wales Legislative Council, 1988–1991

References
 
 Green, Antony. Changing Boundaries, Changing Fortunes: an analysis of the NSW Elections of 1988 and 1991, New South Wales Parliamentary Library Research Service

1988